The 1886 New Jersey gubernatorial election was held on November 2, 1886. Democratic nominee Robert Stockton Green defeated Republican nominee Benjamin Franklin Howey with 47.44% of the vote.

General election

Candidates
Clinton B. Fisk, banker and Civil War general (Prohibition)
Robert Stockton Green, U.S. Representative from Elizabeth (Democratic)
Benjamin Franklin Howey, former U.S. Representative from Columbia (Republican)

Results

References

1886
New Jersey
Gubernatorial
November 1886 events